Nord's 23rd constituency was a French legislative constituency in the Nord département. It was abolished in the 2010 redistricting of French legislative constituencies.

References 

Defunct French legislative constituencies
French legislative constituencies of Nord